Corinne is a female name, the French and English variant of Corina, of ancient Greek origin, derived from κόρη (korē) meaning "beautiful maiden". It became popular following the publication of Corinne, an 1808 novel by Madame de Staël.

Various spellings of the name exist, although some attest that "Corinne" is the most appropriate and age-old spelling. Other spellings include: Corrine, Corin, Corine, Corinn, Coryn, Corryn, Koryn, Korryn, Korin, Corinna, Korinna, Corrin, and Korinne.

Notable people with the given name

Film, stage and television 
 Corinne Alphen (born 1954), American model and actress
 Corinne Barker (1890–1928), American actress and costume designer
Corinne Bohrer (born 1958), American actress
Corinne Brinkerhoff (born 1979), American television producer and writer
Corinne Calvet (1925–2001), French actress
Corynne Charby (born 1960), born Corinne Charbit, French actress, singer, and model
Corinne Cléry (born 1950), French actress
Corinne Cole (born 1937), American model and actress
Corinne Conley (born 1929), American actress
Corinne Foxx (born 1994), American model, actress, and television producer
Corinne Grant (born 1973), Australian comedian and television presenter
Corinne Griffith (1894–1979), American film actress, producer, author, and businesswoman
Corinne Hollingworth (born 1952), British television producer and executive
Corinne Jacker (1933–2013), American playwright and screenwriter
Corinne Jorry (born 1943), French costume designer
Corinne Kimball (1873–1937), American stage performer
Corinne Lahaye (1947–2020), French actress

Corinne Le Poulain (born 1948), French actress
Corinne Luchaire (1921–1950), French actress
Corinne Marchand (born 1937), French actress
Corinne Marrinan (born 1974), Irish-American producer and screenwriter
Corinne Marshall (born 1980), American television writer
Corinne Masiero (born 1964), French actress
Corinne Maury (born 1968), French lecturer and film director
Corinne Orr (born 1936), Canadian actress
Corinne Skinner-Carter (born 1931), Trinidadian actress
Corinne Touzet (born 1959), French actress and producer
Corrinne Wicks (born 1968), British actress

Literature 
Corinne Chaponnière (born 1954), Swiss-Canadian writer and journalist
Corinne Chevallier (born 1935), Algerian historian and novelist
Corinne Demas, American writer and professor
Corinne De Vailly (born 1959), French-born Canadian writer
Corinne Hofmann (born 1960), German-Swiss writer
Corinne Stocker Horton (1871-1947), American elocutionist, journalist, newspaper editor
Corinne Lee, American author, writer, and poet
Corinne McLaughlin (born 1947), American author and educator
Corinne Roche (born 1957), French writer
Corinne Roosevelt Robinson (1861–1933), American writer
Corinne Trang (born 1967), French writer

Music 
Corinne Allal (born 1955), Israeli rock musician and music producer
Corinne Bailey Rae (born 1979), British singer-songwriter and guitarist
Corinne Chapelle (1976–2021), French-American violinist
Corinne Drewery (born 1959), English singer-songwriter and fashion designer
Corinne Gibbons, Australian singer-songwriter
Corinne Hermès (born 1961), French singer
Corrinne May (born 1973), Singaporean singer-songwriter
Corinne Morgan (1876-1942/1945), American singer and pioneer recording artist
Corinne West (born 1970), American singer-songwriter and acoustic guitarist

Politics
Corinne Alsop Cole (1886–1971), American politician
Corinne Bertani (born 1959), Monegasque politician
Corinne Boyd Riley (1893–1979), American politician and teacher
Corrine Brown (born 1946), American politician and convicted felon
Corinne Cahen (born 1973), Luxembourgish politician
Corinne Ellemeet (born 1976), Dutch politician
Corinne Erhel (1967–2017), French politician
Corinne Féret (born 1961), French politician
Corinne Freeman (1926–2014), American politician
Corinne Lepage (born 1951), French politician
Corinne Narassiguin (born 1975), French politician
Corinne Stubbs Brown (1849–1914), American Marxist social activist
Corinne Vignon (born 1963), French politician
Corinne Wood (1954–2021), American government executive

Sports
Corrine Alexander (born 1985), American soccer goalkeeper and artistic photographer known as Cori Alexander
Corinne Bodmer (born 1970), Swiss freestyle skier
Corinne Bourquin, Swiss curler and curling coach
Corinne Buie (born 1992), American ice hockey player
Corinne Clark (1923–2006), American baseball player
Corinne Clos (born 1978), Italian ski mountaineer and long-distance runner
Corinne Diacre (born 1974), French association football player and manager
Corinne Dibnah (born 1962), Australian professional golfer
Corinne Favre (born 1970), French professional ski instructor, ski mountaineer, and mountain runner
Corinne Hall (born 1987), Australian cricketer
Corinne Hérigault (born 1970), French long jumper
Corinne Humphreys (born 1991), English sprinter
Corinne Imlig (born 1979), Swiss alpine skier
Corinne Lagache (born 1975), French footballer
Corinne Leclair (born 1970), Mauritian swimmer
Corinne Le Moal (born 1954), French rower
Corinne Maîtrejean (born 1979), French foil fencer
Corinne Maier (born 1963), Swiss-born French psychoanalyst, economist, and writer
Corinne Migneco, American international table tennis player
Corinne Molesworth (born 1949), English tennis player
Corinne Morris (born 1971), Canadian Olympic curler known as Cori Morris
Corinne Niogret (born 1972), French biathlete
Corinne Nugter (born 1992), Dutch discus thrower
Corinne Paliard (born 1970), French ice dancer
Corinne Peters (born 1960), Canadian curler
Corinne Ragazzacci (born 1969), French gymnast
Corinne Raux (born 1976), French duathlete
Corinne Rey-Bellet (1972–2006), Swiss alpine skier
Corinne Schmidhauser (born 1964), Swiss alpine skier
Corinne Schneider (born 1962), Swiss and Italian athlete
Corinne Serra Tosio (born 1965), French sports shooter
Corinne Simasotchi (born 1971), Swiss sprinter
Corinne Suter (born 1994), Swiss alpine ski racer
Corinne Vanier (born 1963), French tennis player
Corinne Yorston (born 1983), English association football player
Corinne Zanolli (born 1998), American field hockey player

Visual arts 
Corinne Cuéllar-Nathan (born 1958), Swiss painter
Corinne Day (1962–2010), British fashion photographer
Corrine Hunt (born 1959), Indigenous Tlingit artist, carver, jeweller and designer
Corinne Malvern (1901–1956), American actress, commercial artist, and illustrator
Corinne Melchers (1880–1955), American painter, humanitarian, and gardener
Corinne Michelle West (1908–1991), American painter
Corinne Mucha, American cartoonist, illustrator, and teaching artist
Corinne Rey (cartoonist) better known as Coco, cartoonist with Charlie Hebdo
Corinne Silva (born 1976), English artist
Corinne Wasmuht (born 1964), German visual artist
Corinne Whitaker (born 1934), American digital artist

Others
Corinne A. Beckwith (born 1963), American judge
Corinne Bennett (1935–2010), English conservation architect
Corinne Bonnet, French professor and historian
Corinne Debaine-Francfort (birth date unknown), French archaeologist and Sinologist
Corinne Dettmeijer (born 1949), Dutch lawyer
Corinne Dufka (born 1958), American photojournalist, human rights researcher, criminal investigator, and social worker
Corinne Faut (born 1960), Belgian general
Corinne Gallant (1922–2018), Canadian professor emeritus and feminist
Corinne Gendron (born 1968), Canadian scholar, researcher, lawyer, and sociologist
Corinne Grant (born 1973), Australian lawyer, comedian, and television presenter
Corinne Heline (1882–1975) American author, Christian mystic and occultist
Corinne Heraud (born 1963), French official
Corinne Hofman (born 1959), Dutch archaeologist
Corinne Le Quéré (born 1966), French-Canadian scientist
Corinne Manogue (born 1955), American physicist
Corinne Mentzelopoulos (born 1953), French-Greek businesswoman
Corinne Russell (born 1963), English model and dancer
Corinne Schädler (born 1992), Swiss beauty pageant titleholder
Corinne Trang, French teacher, yoga instructor, chef, and author
Corinne Vezzoni (born 1964), French architect
Corinne Vigreux (born 1964), French business executive and entrepreneur
Corinne Watanabe (born 1950), American judge
Corinne Watts, New Zealand entomologist and ecologist
Corinne Veril (born 2000), Indian Software Professional

Fictional characters
Corinne, in the 2009 computer-animated fantasy film Barbie and the Three Musketeers
Corinne, in the 1993 family comedy film Mr. Nanny
Corrine Baxter, from Strange Days at Blake Holsey High
Corinne Maloney, Leslie Mann's character in the movie Big Daddy
Corinne Tate, on the TV sitcom Soap
 "Corrine, Corrina", 1928 blues song
Corrine, Christina Applegate's character in the 2010 film Going the Distance
Corinne Jeffries, in 1989 romantic comedy Chances Are
Corrine Dollanganger, in the 1979 gothic novel "Flowers in the Attic" by V.C. Andrews

See also
 Corina
 Corinna (given name)
 Corinne (disambiguation)

References

French feminine given names